Laboute's wrasse, Cirrhilabrus laboutei, is a species of wrasse native to the coral reefs of New Caledonia and Australia, where it occurs at depths of . It can be found in the aquarium trade. The specific name of this fish honours Pierre Laboute who first photographed this species off New Caledonia and gave J.E. Randall advice on where to collect specimens.

References

Laboute's wrasse
Taxa named by John Ernest Randall
Taxa named by Roger Lubbock
Fish described in 1982